Sahauran is a village in Mohali district, Punjab, India, located on NH 205. The neighbouring towns of village sahauran are Kurali, Kharar, Ropar. The population is about 5000.

Educational Institutions 
Rayat & Bahra Institute of Engineering & Bio-Technology
Doaba Group of colleges
Government High School
Government Secondary School
Chandigarh University ( away from the village)near daumajra village
Navyugam institute (computer course, tuition classes, coaching)

Historical places
Gurudwara Mata Raaj Kaur sahib ji
Baba Sedha Singh Ashram Gurudwara
Dera Baba Malook Dass ji (Gulabdasiye)
Dhakk vala baba, Guga Merhi
Shaheedi asthaan Singh Shaheedan
Prachin Hindu Shiv Mandir
Nirmala dera Bhindranwale
Gurudwara Singh Sabha
Nanak Darbar sahib
Historical well built by Lakhi Shah wanjara

Public places
Baaniyaa di Dharamshala
Harijana di Dharamshala
AMC BMC verka milk dairy
Harjinder tourist Dhaba
Amandeep tourist Dhaba
Veterinary hospital

Government locations
Sahauran Branch Post Office
Punjab Gramin Bank
Punjab National Bank
Dispensary

Private sector places
HDFC Bank
Rayat & Bahra University
Doaba Group of College

Transportation
Sahauran comes in the bus route between Chandigarh and Rupnagar. one can get direct bus to chandigarh and other major cities. Cabs like Uber and Ola are also available to reach nearby cities.

References

Mohali
Villages in Sahibzada Ajit Singh Nagar district